Portland (Amtrak station) may refer either of two significant train stations that are located on opposite coasts of the United States:

 Union Station (Portland, Oregon), the Amtrak station serving Portland, Oregon
 Portland Transportation Center, the Amtrak station serving Portland, Maine

See also
 Portland (disambiguation)
 Portland station (disambiguation)